Mutesa II Stadium is a multi-purpose stadium in Kampala, Uganda.  It is currently used mostly for football matches and serves as the home venue of Express FC of the Ugandan Super League.  The stadium has a capacity of 20,200 people.  It is named after Mutesa II of Buganda.

References
(WANKULUKUKU)

Football venues in Uganda
Multi-purpose stadiums in Uganda
Sport in Kampala
Buildings and structures in Kampala